Adare Saddle is a saddle at about , situated at the junction of Adare Peninsula and the Admiralty Mountains, and at the junction of Newnes Glacier and Moubray Glacier which fall steeply from it. Named by the New Zealand Geological Survey Antarctic Expedition (NZGSAE), 1957–58, in association with Adare Peninsula and Cape Adare. The landform is situated on the Pennell Coast, a portion of Antarctica lying between Cape Williams and Cape Adare.

Mountain passes of Victoria Land
Admiralty Mountains
Pennell Coast